The Linlithgowshire by-election was a Parliamentary by-election held on 7 November 1913. The constituency returned one Member of Parliament (MP) to the House of Commons of the United Kingdom, elected by the first past the post voting system.

Vacancy
Alexander Ure had been Liberal Member of Parliament for Linlithgowshire since 1895. In 1913 he was raised to the bench as Lord Strathclyde and appointed Lord Justice General.

Previous result

Candidates
Forty-year-old former Fabian, John Pratt was selected to defend the seat in the Liberal interest. He was Warden of Glasgow University Settlement, 1902–12 and was a Member of Glasgow Town Council, 1906. However, initially, the West Lothian Liberal Association had sought Robert Brown, the Provost of Dalkeith as their candidate. He was Secretary of the Midlothian miners and one of the few miners leaders in Scotland who were sympathetic to the Liberals. The Liberal Party had previously sought after Brown as their candidate for the 1912 Midlothian by-election where he eventually stood as a Labour Party candidate, finishing bottom of the poll. Brown once more turned down the Liberal offer and the Liberals chose Pratt. 
Edinburgh educated 41-year-old James Kidd  was re-selected by the Unionists, having fought the seat at the last election.
The Labour Party agreed not to put forward a candidate, to avoid splitting the anti-Unionist vote. However, the British Socialist Party, which criticised the Liberal/Labour electoral pact, considered putting forward Robert Small, the Secretary of the West Lothian shale miners. Local branches of the Independent Labour Party also considered running a candidate

Campaign
Some 2,000 Irish electors lived in the constituency and they were expected to heavily support the Liberal candidate. Local branches of the Independent Labour Party asked local electors to vote for the Unionist Party candidate.

Result

Aftermath
A General Election was due to take place by the end of 1915. By the summer of 1914, the following candidates had been adopted to contest that election. Due to the outbreak of war, the election never took place.
Scottish Liberal Party: John Pratt
Unionist Party: James Kidd

For the 1918 elections, Pratt moved to contest Glasgow Cathcart.

References

 Craig, F. W. S. (1974). British parliamentary election results 1885-1918 (1 ed.). London: Macmillan. 
 Who's Who: www.ukwhoswho.com 
 Debrett's House of Commons 1916

1913 in Scotland
1910s elections in Scotland
1913 elections in the United Kingdom
Politics of West Lothian
By-elections to the Parliament of the United Kingdom in Scottish constituencies
History of West Lothian